Iara, also spelled Uiara, Yara or Hiara or Mãe das Águas ("mother of the waters"), is a figure from Brazilian mythology based on the ancient Tupi and Guaraní mythology. The word derives from Old Tupi yîara = y ("water") + îara ("lord; lady") = "lady of the lake" (water queen). Depending on the oral tradition and the context of the story, she can be seen either as a water nymph, a siren, or a beautiful mermaid that lives in the Amazon River.

Overview

According to the oral tale, Iara is a beautiful young woman, sometimes described as having green hair, light brown or copper-colored skin (as that of an Indigenous Amerindian from Brazil, or of a ) and brown eyes, with a tail similar as a freshwater river dolphin, manatee or fish body (the Tupi word y did not have a distinct meaning, being used in general for any riverine or freshwater lacustrine place) who would sit on a rock by the river combing her hair or dozing under the sun. When she felt a man around she would start to sing gently to lure him. Once under the spell of the Iara a man would leave anything to live with her underwater forever, due to the fact that she was pretty and would cater for all the needs of her lover for the rest of his life. Other versions indicate that she slew the men and drowned them.

According to the oral tradition of Brazilian folklore, Iara was a beautiful young indigenous woman in a tribe of patriarchal customs, who developed a talent for warfare and gaining admiration from all of her tribe and respect from her father, the chief of the tribe, but stirred up the envy of her brothers, who decided to sabotage her by murdering her during the night. The legend says Iara knew how to defend herself from the attacks of her brothers and accidentally killed them. Discovered by her father, she took refuge in the woods but was captured and punished for the murders of her brothers by being drowned in the river (some versions orals claim they killed her and dumped her body in the river, blaming the night goddess, Jaci, for her disappearance). Turned into a mermaid upon being saved by the nearby fish on the night of a full moon or by Jaci in some versions, she decided to take revenge on all men by seducing them and drowning them in the river. According to some folkloric accounts, those who survive end up going crazy, or survive with teeth marks on their neck.Aspects of the legend
It is often claimed that, until the 18th century, the Iara legend did not pertain to the image of a seducing, docile river mermaid. Instead, it was originally about an aggressive and monstrous river merman known as Ipupiara ("freshwater monster"), which would readily devour fishers.

Iara is immortal (like the nymphs of Greek mythology), but many of her lovers do age or die. It means that the Iara is condemned to live most of eternity alone.

The legend of the Iara was one of the usual explanations for the disappearance of those who ventured alone in the jungle.

In Latin American mythology
The Iara is similar in nature to several other female figures of folklore from other regions such as La Llorona from Mexico and the Southwestern United States, the Colombian creatures La Patasola and the Tunda and the Deer Woman of North America.  All are females who at times function as sirens leading men to their death.

This physical deformity marking an otherwise perfect woman is a common theme among siren figures in the Americas but it is usually one of the feet. Deer Woman has hooves 
for feet, La Patasola and the Tunda have deformed feet and La Llorona is often said to have no feet by those who see her.

Adaptations
Andrew Lang wrote an adaptation of the legend of Yara in The Brown Fairy Book.

American naturalist Herbert Huntingdon Smith recorded a version of the legend of Yara, which he titled Oiará, The Water-Maidens.

Legacy and influence
Iara (or Yara) is a very popular female name in Brazil.

In modern media
In the film version of the novel Macunaíma (1969), the eponymous protagonist meets his death at the hands of an Iara. He embraces her eagerly and sees too late the blow hole in the back of her neck that gives her away as the creature she is and not the beautiful woman he mistook her for.

In 2021 Brazilian supernatural TV series, Invisible City, the protagonist meets an Iara but survives her drowning attempts. She tells him that she became an Iara after her lover killed and drowned her in a river, but she was resurrected.

In the 2021 DC Comics' Wonder Girl comic book starring the future Brazilian Wonder Woman, Yara Flor, Iara was a great Brazilian warrior who was later transformed into a mermaid-like divine being as the protector of the sacred waters. It was she who bestowed on Yara Flor her characteristic weapon of power, the Golden Boleadoras.

Iara appears in AdventureQuest Worlds. It was mentioned that Iara was knocked off the cliff into the river during a family scuffle and was turned into a mermaid by nature itself.

In Love, Death & Robots season 3 (2022), a deaf warrior meets an Iara who lures his comrades with her screams, causing them to enter a dancing frenzy, rushing to her to ultimately drown in the lake.

See also
 La Llorona'': similar supernatural creature from Native Mexican folklore 
 Siren
 Mermaid
 Undine
 Nixie
 Tupi people

Notes

Further reading
 
  http://revistas.unisinos.br/index.php/fronteiras/article/view/fem.2015.172.10 
 Sá, Lúcia, Maria Ignez França, and Lemos, Rafaella. "Macunaíma (1928)." In Literatura Da Floresta: Textos Amazônicos E Cultura Latino-americana, 79-120. Rio De Janeiro: SciELO – EDUERJ, 2004. 

Mermaids
Brazilian legendary creatures
Tupí legendary creatures
Guaraní legendary creatures
Brazilian folklore
Supernatural legends